Yannick Grannec is a 21st-century French writer whose first novel  published 28 December 2012 at , in Paris, received the 2013 prix des libraires.

Biography 
Born in 1969 and graduated from the ENSCI, Grannec worked as a graphic designer and published books for young people, including: Bleus, Rouges, Jaunes, Verts, and children's albums published in October 2003 by Didier, in the "Mirliton" series.

Installed at Saint-Paul-de-Vence, she devoted herself to writing. Her passion for mathematics led her to write the novel of the life of the brilliant Austrian mathematician Kurt Gödel told by his widow, Adele, in La Déesse des petites victoires.

The novel was a major success of the press and was crowned by the Prix des libraires in March 2013.

References

External links 
 Yannick Grannec on Babelio
 Roman, Le Bal mécanique, Yannick Grannec on Mots pour mots
 Le Bal mécanique: un roman captivant autour du Bauhaus, signé Yannick Grannec
 Yannick Grannec mène la danse on Le Monde (25 August 2016)
 A la rencontre des auteurs de la rentrée littéraire : Yannick Grannec on YouTube

21st-century French non-fiction writers
Prix des libraires winners
1969 births
Living people
21st-century French women writers